The 1971 CFL season is considered to be the 18th season in modern-day Canadian football, although it was officially the 14th Canadian Football League season.

CFL News for 1971
The Grey Cup Championship was played on artificial turf for the first time in Vancouver.
The BC Lions also wore special "CCC"-logo helmets to commemorate the Canadian Confederation Centennial of British Columbia, the province having entered into Canadian Confederation a hundred years earlier, in 1871. The flower in the centre of the "CCC" logo is the pacific dogwood, the official provincial flower of British Columbia.

All CFL teams had their player's last names appearing on the jersey backs (at shoulder height, above the back number) beginning this season.

This would be the last year until 2006 that the Edmonton Eskimos would miss the playoffs; in the intervening years, they would reach the playoffs for 33 straight years.

Regular season standings

Final regular season standings
Note: GP = Games Played, W = Wins, L = Losses, T = Ties, PF = Points For, PA = Points Against, Pts = Points

Bold text indicates that the team clinched a playoff berth.
Calgary and Toronto had first round byes.

1971 Grey Cup Playoffs

Conference Semi-Finals

Conference Finals

Playoff bracket

Grey Cup Championship

1971 CFL All-Stars

Offence
QB – Don Jonas, Winnipeg Blue Bombers
RB – George Reed, Saskatchewan Roughriders
RB – Jim Evenson, BC Lions
RB – Leon McQuay, Toronto Argonauts
TE – Mel Profit, Toronto Argonauts
SE – Jim Thorpe, Winnipeg Blue Bombers
WR – Bob LaRose, Winnipeg Blue Bombers
C – Bob Swift, Winnipeg Blue Bombers
OG – Jack Abendschan, Saskatchewan Roughriders
OG – Granville Liggins, Calgary Stampeders
OT – Bill Frank, Winnipeg Blue Bombers
OT – Ed George, Montreal Alouettes

Defence
DT – John Helton, Calgary Stampeders
DT – Jim Stillwagon, Toronto Argonauts
DE – Jim Corrigall, Toronto Argonauts
DE – Craig Koinzan, Calgary Stampeders
LB – Wayne Harris, Calgary Stampeders
LB – Mark Kosmos, Montreal Alouettes
LB – Jerry Campbell, Ottawa Rough Riders
DB – Dick Dupuis, Edmonton Eskimos
DB – Frank Andruski, Calgary Stampeders
DB – Garney Henley, Hamilton Tiger-Cats
DB – Marv Luster, Toronto Argonauts
DB – Dick Thornton, Toronto Argonauts

1971 Eastern All-Stars

Offence
QB – Joe Theismann, Toronto Argonauts
RB – Dennis Duncan, Ottawa Rough Riders
RB – Bruce Van Ness, Montreal Alouettes
RB – Leon McQuay, Toronto Argonauts
TE – Mel Profit, Toronto Argonauts
SE – Terry Evanshen, Montreal Alouettes
WR – Mike Eben, Toronto Argonauts
C – Paul Desjardins, Toronto Argonauts
OG – Charlie Bray, Toronto Argonauts
OG – Justin Canale, Montreal Alouettes
OT – Ellison Kelly, Toronto Argonauts
OT – Ed George, Montreal Alouettes

Defence
DT – Rudy Sims, Ottawa Rough Riders
DT – Jim Stillwagon, Toronto Argonauts
DE – Jim Corrigall, Toronto Argonauts
DE – Tom Laputka, Ottawa Rough Riders
LB – Mike Blum, Hamilton Tiger-Cats
LB – Mark Kosmos, Montreal Alouettes
LB – Steve Smear, Montreal Alouettes
DB – Johnny Williams, Hamilton Tiger-Cats
DB – Gene Gaines, Montreal Alouettes
DB – Garney Henley, Hamilton Tiger-Cats
DB – Marv Luster, Toronto Argonauts
DB – Dick Thornton, Toronto Argonauts

1971 Western All-Stars

Offence
QB – Don Jonas, Winnipeg Blue Bombers
RB – George Reed, Saskatchewan Roughriders
RB – Jim Evenson, BC Lions
RB – Mack Herron, Winnipeg Blue Bombers
TE – Herm Harrison, Calgary Stampeders
SE – Jim Thorpe, Winnipeg Blue Bombers
WR – Bob LaRose, Winnipeg Blue Bombers
C – Bob Swift, Winnipeg Blue Bombers
C – Basil Bark, Calgary Stampeders
OG – Jack Abendschan, Saskatchewan Roughriders
OG – Granville Liggins, Calgary Stampeders
OT – Bill Frank, Winnipeg Blue Bombers
OT – Ken Sugarman, BC Lions

Defence
DT – John Helton, Calgary Stampeders
DT – John LaGrone, Edmonton Eskimos
DE – Bill Baker, Saskatchewan Roughriders
DE – Dick Suderman, Calgary Stampeders
DE – Craig Koinzan, Calgary Stampeders
LB – Wayne Harris, Calgary Stampeders
LB – Dave Gasser, Edmonton Eskimos
LB – Rob McLaren, Winnipeg Blue Bombers
LB – Wayne Shaw, Saskatchewan Roughriders
DB – Dick Dupuis, Edmonton Eskimos
DB – Frank Andruski, Calgary Stampeders
DB – Bruce Bennett, Saskatchewan Roughriders
DB – Larry Robinson, Calgary Stampeders
DB – Howard Starks, Calgary Stampeders

1971 CFL Awards
CFL's Most Outstanding Player Award – Don Jonas (QB), Winnipeg Blue Bombers
CFL's Most Outstanding Canadian Award – Terry Evanshen (WR), Montreal Alouettes
CFL's Most Outstanding Lineman Award – Wayne Harris (LB), Calgary Stampeders
CFL's Coach of the Year – Leo Cahill, Toronto Argonauts
 Jeff Russel Memorial Trophy (Eastern MVP) – Mel Profit (TE), Toronto Argonauts
 Jeff Nicklin Memorial Trophy (Western MVP) - Don Jonas (QB), Winnipeg Blue Bombers
 Gruen Trophy (Eastern Rookie of the Year) - Jim Foley (SB), Montreal Alouettes
 Dr. Beattie Martin Trophy (Western Rookie of the Year) - Bob Kraemer (DB), Winnipeg Blue Bombers
 DeMarco–Becket Memorial Trophy (Western Outstanding Lineman) - Wayne Harris (LB), Calgary Stampeders

References 

CFL
Canadian Football League seasons